Jaimanglapur  is a village development committee in Parsa District in the Narayani Zone of southern Nepal. At the time of the 2011 Nepal census it had a population of 5,398 people living in 810 individual households. There were 2,721 males and 2,677 females at the time of census.

References

Populated places in Parsa District